Muhammad Osman Said (17 October 1924 – 31 December 2007) was a Libyan politician who held many positions in the era of the Kingdom of Libya including the Prime Minister of Libya from 17 October 1960 to 19 March 1963.

Biography 
Mohammed Osman al-Said was born on 17 Chaabane 1343 AH (October 17, 1924), in Zaouia Moutasarrifya Brak, a village in the Fezzane region of southern Libya.

In difficult conditions caused by the Italian occupation, Mohammed Othmane Assed learned the Koran in 1928, that is to say at the age of 13 years. He is followed by many theologian scholars with other classmates.

After the independence of Libya, Mohammed Othmane Assed was appointed Minister of Public Health in 1951, and remained until 1958. He made many projects during this period.

He is appointed February 15, 1960 Minister of Economy in the Ka'bar government. Then he was transferred in September 1960 to the Ministry of Finance.

He is the father of nine children.

References

Prime Ministers of Libya
1924 births
2007 deaths
Health ministers of Libya
Finance ministers of Libya